Guttiferales is a descriptive botanical name. It was used in the Bentham & Hooker system, the Wettstein system and Bessey system for an order of flowering plants that included the family Guttiferae. The latter is also a descriptive botanical name and refers to the latex present in these plants.  

The order was fairly small in the Bentham & Hooker system:
order Guttiferales
 family Elatinaceae
 family Hypericaceae
 family Guttiferae
 family Ternstroemiaceae
 family Dipterocarpaceae
 family Chlenaceae

It was much larger in the Wettstein system:

 order Guttiferales
 family Dilleniaceae
 family Actinidiaceae 
 family Ochnaceae
 family Strassburgeriaceae
 family Eucryphiaceae
 family Caryocaraceae
 family Marcgraviaceae
 family Quiinaceae
 family Theaceae
 family Guttiferae
 family Dipterocarpaceae

The difference in composition between these two systems, and the fact that these taxa were scattered over various orders in more recent systems such as the Cronquist system and the APG II system suggests it was never a very good unit in the first place. (Note that Bentham & Hooker's Ternstroemiaceae is equivalent to Wettsteins's Theaceae, and that Wettstein's Guttiferae includes Bentham & Hooker's Hypericaceae.)

Historically recognized angiosperm orders